The 1917 New York City mayoral election replaced sitting mayor John P. Mitchel, a reform Democrat running on the Fusion Party ticket, with John F. Hylan, the regular Democrat supported by Tammany Hall and William Randolph Hearst.

The election was notable not only for the first partisan primary elections for City offices, but for the contentious debate over supporting U.S. entry into World War One, vigorously supported by Mitchel and opposed by the Socialist candidate, Morris Hillquit. Mitchel and Hillquit each won about a fifth of the total vote, while Hylan won office with less than half the vote.

The campaign
The Fall 1917 election, which The New York Times called a "puzzle without parallel", would have been exciting even had it occurred in peacetime. In September, the  City held its first-ever primary elections for mayor. Incumbent Fusion Mayor John Purroy Mitchel (an insurgent Democrat) who had enjoyed Republican non-opposition in 1913, apparently won the Republican primary until a series of counting mistakes and frauds (followed by criminal indictments) forced recounts that gave a narrow victory to William M. Bennett. Attempts to find a compromise anti-Tammany candidate failed, Bennett declined to withdraw from the race, and Mitchel went on to wage an independent campaign for re-election.

But the mayoral election happened in the same year as the United States' entry into World War One on April 6. An emergency national convention and referendum of the Socialist Party of America overwhelmingly approved a resolution, co-authored by Morris Hillquit (the Party's candidate for Mayor of New York), which proclaimed,

The Socialist Party of the United States in the present grave crisis solemnly reaffirms its allegiance to the principle of internationalism and working-class solidarity the world over, and proclaims its unalterable opposition to the war just declared by the Government of the United States.

Hillquit's refusal to support the war by such acts as buying Liberty Bonds won the Socialists new support in many immigrant communities, but vitriolic denunciations from many quarters, including The New York Times, Mayor Mitchel, who hinted at Hillquit's foreign birth by saying that "any man who will not buy a Liberty bond when he can afford them is not fit to be a citizen of the United States", and ex-President Theodore Roosevelt (the Republicans' 1886 candidate for mayor), who declared that Hillquit "stands as an aid to the Prussianized autocracy of the Hohenzollerns."

The Fusion campaign decided to direct its last week against Hillquit (who would eclipse Mitchel in The Bronx while matching his vote in Queens and Brooklyn), rather than against Judge John F. Hylan, the candidate of Tammany Hall and William Randolph Hearst. (Hearst, the newspaper publisher who was the 1905 Mayoral candidate of the Municipal Ownership League, and Hylan, who had started life operating subway trains, were both strong opponents of the city's private transit companies.)  Hylan's position on the war was unclear, but not his sharp victory over all three of his major rivals on November 6 (exactly seven months after the U.S. Declaration of War and one day before the Bolshevik Revolution in Russia). Although a divided opposition let Hylan carry the City and three of her boroughs with less than 50% of the total vote, the numbers (as in 1897) suggest that Tammany Hall might very easily have won a two-candidate race.

The New York City Socialists won the highest percentage of the Mayoral vote they would ever receive, while electing ten State Assemblymen, seven city Aldermen, and a municipal court judge.

Running for president of the board of aldermen (the position from which acting mayors succeeded when elected mayors could not serve) on the same Democratic ticket as Hylan was Al Smith, then Sheriff of New York County (Manhattan), and previously Democratic Leader and Speaker of the New York State Assembly. (Smith had hoped to run for mayor himself, but Tammany Hall leader Charles F. Murphy chose Hylan instead, partly out of deference to Hearst and to John McCooey, the Democratic leader in Brooklyn.) Smith easily defeated the New York City Fire Commissioner, Robert Adamson, who was running for Board President on the Fusion ticket with Mitchel.

Later careers of the participants
 Ex-Mayor Mitchel volunteered for air service with the U.S. Army Signal Corps and fell out of his aircraft to his death while training on July 6, 1918 (exactly eight months after Election Day).
 Eight days later, on Bastille Day, 1918, Quentin Roosevelt, the youngest son of Theodore Roosevelt, died in aerial combat in France, leading the former President to become more withdrawn before he himself died on January 6, 1919 (six months after Mitchel).
 The Socialist Party of America suffered crippling losses from government actions during the war and the departure of most of its members in 1919 to start the American Communist movement. Morris Hillquit, who stayed with the Party he had helped to found, ran again for Mayor in 1932 (receiving an eighth of the vote) and died the next year.
 In November 1918, after a year as President of the Board of Aldermen, Alfred E. Smith was elected to the first of four terms as Governor of New York by unseating the incumbent Republican Governor Charles S. Whitman. (Smith lost re-election in 1920, but won three successive terms in 1922, 1924 and 1926.) In 1928, he ran unsuccessfully as the Democratic candidate for President of the United States against the Republican Herbert Hoover.
 John F. Hylan was re-elected Mayor in 1921 but lost the 1925 Democratic primary to Jimmy Walker after a split among Democratic borough leaders, reflecting the deep enmity between Hylan's patron, W. R. Hearst, and Hylan's 1917 running-mate, Al Smith (now Governor). Mayor Walker later returned Judge Hylan to the bench by appointing him to the Children's Court.

General election results
Mayor Mitchel ran second to Judge Hylan in every borough but the Bronx, where Hillquit pushed Mitchel into third place. (Hillquit came within 200 votes of doing the same in Queens.) Bennett (the Republican), who came in fourth everywhere else, came third  and pushed Hillquit into fourth place (and below 10%) on Staten Island. Hylan (who led everywhere) won pluralities, rather than absolute majorities, in the City as a whole and in Manhattan, the Bronx and Brooklyn, winning a slim overall majority in Queens and a decisive (4–3) majority on Staten Island.

[Others and Total from The Encyclopedia of New York City (Yale, 1995), which does not exactly match the other numbers, taken from The World Almanac  for 1929 & 1943.]

See also
 New York City mayoral elections
 Characteristics of New York City mayoral elections
 History of New York City
 Socialist Party of America
 Tammany Hall
 J. Raymond Jones

References

Sources
 The New York Times archives for September–November, 1917
 
 The World Almanac and Book of Facts for 1929 and 1943
 James Weinstein, The Decline of Socialism in America, 1912-1925 (New York 1967: Monthly Review Press & 1969: Vintage)
 David A. Shannon, The Socialist Party of America: a history (New York 1950: Macmillan and Chicago 1967: Quadrangle)
 The Encyclopedia of New York City, edited by Kenneth T. Jackson (New Haven, Connecticut, 1995: Yale University Press & New York Historical Society) 

Mayoral election
1917
1917 New York (state) elections
New York
November 1917 events